, (born July 26, 1974) better known by her stagename Sister MAYO, is a Japanese singer. She is a member of the Columbia Music Entertainment duo Cyber Nation Network, and a vocalist in Project.R which performs many theme songs for the Super Sentai series, some have reached the top ten in Oricon's charts.  Her best-known songs as a soloist have been the opening theme of Haré+Guu and the ending theme of Mahou Sentai Magiranger. She is the younger sister of heavy metal musician Taiji, with whom she was in the rock band Otokaze.

After attending vocational school, she got a job at a travel agency. After suffering from a herniated disc, she decided to pursue her dream of being a musician. She released her first single in 1997 under her own name. A producer gave her her stage name when she joined Cyber Nation Network.

In appearances, she generally wears a baseball cap. Nippon Columbia asked her to take off one or the other, and she decided to keep the cap.

In 2020, she started the unit Rainbow☆MAG!C with Hideyuki Takahashi and Natsuo.

Discography

Singles

Albums

Personal life
Sister MAYO is the younger sister of Taiji Sawada, who was a bassist for X Japan and various other groups. Taiji died on July 17, 2011.

References

External links
  
 Masayo Sawada at Oricon 
 Sister Mayo with Karate Bravo at Oricon 
 Sister MAYO @ Anison Generation 
 

Living people
1974 births
Anime musicians
Japanese women pop singers
Musicians from Chiba Prefecture
People from Ichikawa, Chiba
21st-century Japanese singers
21st-century Japanese women singers